The men's team competition of the 2015 World Judo Championships was held on 30 August.

Each team consisted of five judokas from the –66, 73, 81, 90 and +90 kg categories.

Medalists

Results

Repechage

Prize money
The sums listed bring the total prizes awarded to 50,000$ for the individual event.

References

External links
 
 Draw

Men's team
World Men's Team Judo Championships
World 2015